Jerry Herman Codiñera (born November 14, 1966) is a Filipino coach and retired professional basketball player of the Philippine Basketball Association. He is nicknamed the "Defense Minister" for his prowess at the defensive end. He is the current head coach of Homelab Nation – Bagong Cabuyao of Pilipinas Super League.

Basketball career

Collegiate / Amateur career

Codiñera played college basketball at the University of the East. With Allan Caidic, they led the UE Red Warriors to back to back championship in 1984-1985, the last championship of the Red Warriors in UAAP. Prior to joining the PBA in 1988, he played for Magnolia in the Philippine Amateur Basketball League (PABL, now the Philippine Basketball League).

Professional career

For 12 seasons suiting up for Purefoods, Codiñera was one half of the most dominant duo to ever terrorize the All-Filipino hardcourts. But a trade split up his partnership with Alvin Patrimonio and saw him wear a new jersey for the first time since joining the PBA in 1988. On July 8, 1999, in the middle of the 1999 PBA Commissioner's Cup, he was traded to Mobiline for Andy Seigle.

A perennial member of the All-Defensive Team, he was given the moniker "Defense Minister" for his tireless manning of the post. In fact, the 6-5 Codiñera was also a terror on the offensive end who was blessed with an unerring 18-foot jumpshot not normally found in big men. He came close to winning an MVP award in 1993 but lost to Patrimonio in the tightest race for the prestigious trophy in league history. He also won the first PBA Best Player of the Conference award back in the 1994 All-Filipino Cup.

He is also a member of the 25 Best Players of all Time of PBA and Philippine men's national basketball team of the 1994 Asian Games.

His #44 jersey was retired along with Rey Evangelista's #7 by the Purefoods franchise on November 9, 2014 before their game against Ginebra at the Smart Araneta Coliseum.

Coaching career

He made his head coaching debut with the Teletech Titans in the Philippine Basketball League in 2006. He also served as one of the assistant coaches of the UP Fighting Maroons.

In January 2011, he was named head coach of the University of the East Red Warriors.  He was relieved of his coaching duties midway through the 2012 UAAP season after amassing a 1-6 win–loss record in the first round. He was later reassigned as UE Sports Consultant.

On December 13, 2013, he took over the coaching duties for the Arellano Chiefs, replacing Koy Banal. In his first season with the Chiefs during the 2014 NCAA season, he helped the squad earn a remarkable 13-5 win–loss record as second place after the eliminations and secure a twice-to-beat advantage and ticket to the Finals against San Beda Red Lions.

On February 20, 2018, he made his head coaching debut for Imus Bandera of Maharlika Pilipinas Basketball League

Coaching record

Collegiate record

As a television analyst

Codiñera served as a studio game analyst for UNTV Cup which is the first charity game dedicated for public servants and celebrities in the Philippines an original concept by Mr. Public Service Daniel Razon. He appears on the UNTV Cup Season 2 coverage during pre-game and halftime shows, in addition to special UNTV Cup events.

Non-basketball career
Outside basketball, he has also dabbled into movies and television during the early '90s. His first movie, Last Two Minutes (1990) was a top-grosser at the box-office. The movie co-starred him with teammate Alvin Patrimonio and Bong Alvarez. The movie also spawned a sitcom of the same title aired over PTV 4 where they co-starred with PBA legend Yoyong Martirez. The basketball trio reunited on-screen in 1993 to do Tasya Fantasya opposite Kris Aquino.

See also
 Philippine Basketball Association
 Purefoods Tender Juicy Giants
 UE Red Warriors
 Philippines men's national basketball team
 Air21 Express
 Talk 'N Text Tropang Texters
 Basketball in the Philippines
 UNTV Cup
 Maharlika Pilipinas Basketball League
 Imus Bandera

References

External links
 PBA Website
 Player Profile at PBA-Online!

1966 births
Living people
Asian Games bronze medalists for the Philippines
Asian Games medalists in basketball
Barako Bull Energy players
Basketball players at the 1986 Asian Games
Basketball players at the 1994 Asian Games
Centers (basketball)
Filipino men's basketball coaches
Philippine Basketball Association All-Stars
Philippine Basketball Association players with retired numbers
Philippines men's national basketball team players
Filipino men's basketball players
Power forwards (basketball)
Magnolia Hotshots players
TNT Tropang Giga players
UE Red Warriors basketball players
Medalists at the 1986 Asian Games
UE Red Warriors basketball coaches
Arellano Chiefs basketball coaches